The Gehrlein GP-1 is an American mid-wing, single seat FAI Standard Class glider that was designed by Jay and Rod Gehrlein and first flown in July 1968.

Design and development
When their father, glider pilot Larry Gehrlein was on an extended vacation, his two sons, Rod and Jay decided to design and build a new glider as a surprise for his return. The resulting GP-1 was designed and built in under a year, between the summer of 1968 and the summer of 1969.

Unlike Larry Gehrlein's earlier Gehrlein Precursor, the GP-1 is an original design and uses no Schweizer Aircraft parts in its construction.

The GP-1 is an all-metal aircraft, with a  wingspan. The wing is of a constant  chord and employs a Wortmann FX-61-184 airfoil. Glide path control is via a set of scissor-type spoilers and air brakes. The design was intended to be simple to construct. Kits were at one time offered for sale with at least five aircraft being completed.

Operational history
In May 2011 there were still four GP-1s on the Federal Aviation Administration registry.

Specifications (GP-1)

See also

References

1960s United States sailplanes
Homebuilt aircraft
Aircraft first flown in 1968